Alfred Rowton Giblett (30 May 1908 – 19 June 1943) was an Australian rules footballer who played for the Hawthorn Football Club in the Victorian Football League (VFL). He was killed in action in World War II.

Family
Son of Samuel Robert Giblett (1873–1940), and Edith Sarah Giblett (1872–1956), née Small, Alfred Rowton Giblett was born at Warrnambool on 30 May 1908.

He married Valma Olive Cocking (1911–1994), at Surrey Hill, on 21 December 1935. They had three children; Patricia Giblett (1937–?), Anthony Jackson Giblett (1939–2010), and Lynne (1942–?).

Football
Having been declared the best and fairest player in the A Grade of the Eastern Suburbs Churches Association in both 1933 and 1934, Giblett was granted a clearance from South Hawthorn United (formerly South Hawthorn Presbyterians) to Hawthorn on 24 April 1935.

Military service

He enlisted in the Second AIF and served overseas with the 2/24th Battalion.

Death
He was reported "missing in action" whilst under light machine gun (L.M.G.) fire on 19 June 1943; and, on the basis of evidence that was presented to an official investigation, it was recommended that the official records be reclassified to read "Missing believed Killed".

Commemorated
He has no known grave. He is commemorated at the Port Moresby War Cemetery.

See also
 List of Victorian Football League players who died in active service

Footnotes

References
 Holmesby, Russell & Main, Jim (2007). The Encyclopedia of AFL Footballers. 7th ed. Melbourne: Bas Publishing.
 Main, J. & Allen, D., "Giblett, Alf", pp. 249–253 in Main, J. & Allen, D., Fallen – The Ultimate Heroes: Footballers Who Never Returned From War, Crown Content, (Melbourne), 2002. 
 World War Two Nominal Roll: Corporal Alfred Rowton Giblett (VX135886), Department of Veterans' Affairs.
 World War Two Service Record: Corporal Alfred Rowton Giblett (VX135886), National Archives of Australia.
 Roll of Honour: Corporal Alfred Rowton Giblett (VX135886), Australian War Memorial.

External links
 
 

1908 births
1943 deaths
Australian rules footballers from Victoria (Australia)
Hawthorn Football Club players
Australian military personnel killed in World War II
Australian Army personnel of World War II
Missing in action of World War II
Australian Army soldiers